Juan Díaz is a corregimiento within Panama City, in Panamá District, Panamá Province, Panama with a population of 100,636 as of 2010. Its population as of 1990 was 73,809; its population as of 2000 was 88,165.

References

Corregimientos of Panamá Province
Panamá District